Theodore Herzl Ainley (3 October 1903 – 19 March 1968) was a British trade union leader and communist activist.

Born Theodore Abrahamson in Cheetham, in Manchester, he was educated at a Jewish school, leaving when he was thirteen, to undertake an apprenticeship as a chemist.  He soon left this, and instead found work making waterproof garments.  In 1929, he changed his surname to "Ainley", a change which his brother, Ben, had made two years before.

Ted was influenced by Ben's socialism, and both Ted and his younger brother David became founder members of the Manchester Young Communist League (YCL) in 1922.  Ted joined the Communist Party of Great Britain the following year, and also began working full-time for the YCL, as its organiser for North East England and Glasgow.  He was elected to the National Executive of Committee of the YCL, and in 1929, attended the Lenin School in Moscow.

Ainley returned to the UK and his former post in 1930, then in 1931 moved back to Manchester, and in 1932, on to London, where he took a post with the Daily Worker.  This proved only short-term, and he returned again to Manchester, working at the Books and Books shop until it closed in 1935.  He then returned to making waterproof clothing, joining the Waterproof Garment Workers' Union, and in 1937 he was elected as general secretary of the union.  However, other figures in the union objected to his communism, and he was soon removed from office.  He resigned from the union, and instead found work as an organiser for the Shop Assistants' Union.

In 1943, Ainley changed job again, becoming National Organiser for the Association of Scientific Workers.  He won election as the union's general secretary in 1949, but took early retirement in 1951 due to poor health.  He returned to working for the Communist Party, spending time as secretary of its Economic Committee, and then of its Cultural Committee. From 1957 until 1962, he was the editor of World News and Views, the party's weekly journal.

References

1903 births
1968 deaths
Communist Party of Great Britain members
General secretaries of British trade unions
International Lenin School alumni
Trade unionists from Manchester